The Rasulid Hexaglot is a 14th-century glossary written by or prepared for the Yemeni King Al-Afdal al-Abbas (r. 1363–1377), containing words in six languages: Arabic, Persian, Turkic, Greek, Armenian, and Mongolian. Although produced in Yemen, the Rasulid Hexaglot in many respect was a product of the Eurasian world that was shaped by the Mongol conquest. The Mongols brought East and West Asia into closer contact which encouraged the study of languages.

References

Bibliography
 P. B. Golden, ed., The King’s Dictionary: The Rasūlid Hexaglot – Fourteenth Century Vocabularies in Arabic, Persian, Turkic, Greek, Armenian and Mongol, tr. T. Halasi- Kun, P. B. Golden, L. Ligeti, and E. Schütz, HO VIII/4, Leiden, 2000.

External links
 
Multilingual dictionaries
Arabic dictionaries
Mongolian dictionaries
Turkish dictionaries
Medieval Greek
Persian dictionaries
Armenian dictionaries
Rasulid dynasty